Luke is the third solo studio album by Steve Lukather, released in 1997. It was a much different and more introspective album than Lukather's previous two solo efforts. The album is a concentrated collection of many of Lukather's musical influences, and he deliberately let those influences come out on the album.  Luke is an experimental album, and like Candyman it was recorded mostly in live sessions with minimal overdubbing and processing afterward.  Luke also features instrumentation not heard on previous Lukather albums such as pedal steel, harmonicas, Mellotrons, and experimental guitar, bass, and drum sounds.

The US version of Luke includes a version of the Jeff Beck song "The Pump."  The song "Hate Everything About You" was released as a single.

Track listing
 "The Real Truth" (Lukather, Fee Waybill) – 5:10
 "Broken Machine" (Lukather, Phil Soussan) - 4:54
 "Tears Of My Own Shame" (Lukather, Phil Soussan) - 5:38
 "Love The Things You Hate" (Lukather, Phil Soussan) - 5:44
 "Hate Everything About U" (Lukather, Rodney Crowell) - 5:56
 "Reservations To Live (The Way It Is)" (Lukather, Fee Waybill) - 4:49
 "Don't Hang On Me" (Lukather, Phil Soussan) - 4:40
 "Always Be There For Me" (Lukather) - 5:38
 "Open Your Heart" (Lukather, Randy Goodrum) - 4:27
 "Bag O' Tales" (Lukather, Phil Soussan) - 5:50
 "Bluebird" (Stephen Stills) - 6:42
 "The Pump" (Simon Phillips, Tony Hymas) - 9:33

Personnel 
Adapted from album’s liner notes.

 Steve Lukather – lead vocals, all guitars (1-4, 7, 8, 10-12), Wurlitzer organ (1, 8),  Mellotron (1, 7), keyboards (2), electric sitar (4), acoustic guitar (5, 6, 9), electric guitar (5, 6, 9), harmonica (5), backing vocals (5, 6, 8-11), Hammond organ (8)
 Jim Cox – Hammond organ (1, 5, 6), Wurlitzer organ (5), Fender Rhodes (6)
 David Paich – Wurlitzer organ (9)
 Brent Tuggle – keyboards (12)
 Jay Dee Maness – pedal steel guitar (5, 6)
 John Pierce – bass (1, 5, 6, 8, 11)
 Phil Soussan – bass (2–4, 7, 10), backing vocals (2, 4, 7, 10)
 Pino Palladino – bass (9)
 Gregg Bissonette – drums, percussion (5)
 Maxi Anderson – backing vocals (3)
 Alfie Silas Duno – backing vocals (3)

Production 
 Steve Lukather – producer, arrangements 
 Tom Fletcher – producer, arrangements, engineer 
 Bill Smith – engineer 
 Lee Bench – second engineer 
 David Nottingham – second engineer 
 Bodie Olmos – assistant engineer 
 Elliot Scheiner – mixing 
 Stephen Marcussen – mastering 
 Anita Heilig – production coordinator 
 Doug Brown – creative direction
 Eric Scott – art direction, design 
 Mixed at The Village Recorder (Los Angeles, California).
 Mastered at Marcussen Mastering (Hollywood, California).

References

External links
Album information

Steve Lukather albums
1997 albums